DMC Huron Valley-Sinai Hospital, in Commerce Township, Michigan, is one of the eight hospitals/institutes composing the Detroit Medical Center. Huron-Valley-Sinai contains the Harris Birthing Center, a regional specialty center, the Charach Cancer Treatment Center, (affiliated with the Barbara Ann Karmanos Cancer Center), the Krieger Center for Senior Adults, surgical suites, cardiac services, and comprehensive inpatient and outpatient diagnostic care.

Clinical Services 
Huron Valley-Sinai Hospital offers the following clinical services:

Cardiac Services
Emergency Medicine
Endoscopy
Imaging
Obstetrics/Gynecology (Harris Birthing Center)
Oncology (Charach Cancer Treatment Center)
Orthopedics
Pediatrics
Rehabilitation Services
Senior Services
Surgical Services
Women's Health (The Sinai Center for Women)

Ranking and accreditation 
Huron Valley-Sinai Hospital received the Distinguished Hospital for Clinical Excellence Award (2008) from HealthGrades.

Huron Valley is fully accredited by the Joint Commission on Accreditation of Healthcare Organizations (JCAHO). The Joint Commission assesses the quality of care and safety for more than 15,000 health care organizations. The Joint Commission conducts an extensive on-site review at least once every three years whose purpose is to evaluate the organization's performance in areas that affect patient care.

References

External links

 Detroit Medical Center
 DMC Huron Valley Sinai-Hospital

Hospitals in Michigan
Buildings and structures in Oakland County, Michigan
Detroit Medical Center
Commerce Township, Michigan
Tenet Healthcare